FIVB World Cup results may refer to
 FIVB Volleyball Men's World Cup
 FIVB Volleyball Women's World Cup